Robert Hues (1553 – 24 May 1632) was an English mathematician and geographer. He attended St. Mary Hall at Oxford, and graduated in 1578. Hues became interested in geography and mathematics, and studied navigation at a school set up by Walter Raleigh. During a trip to Newfoundland, he made observations which caused him to doubt the accepted published values for variations of the compass. Between 1586 and 1588, Hues travelled with Thomas Cavendish on a circumnavigation of the globe, performing astronomical observations and taking the latitudes of places they visited. Beginning in August 1591, Hues and Cavendish again set out on another circumnavigation of the globe. During the voyage, Hues made astronomical observations in the South Atlantic, and continued his observations of the variation of the compass at various latitudes and at the Equator. Cavendish died on the journey in 1592, and Hues returned to England the following year.

In 1594, Hues published his discoveries in the Latin work Tractatus de globis et eorum usu (Treatise on Globes and Their Use) which was written to explain the use of the terrestrial and celestial globes that had been made and published by Emery Molyneux in late 1592 or early 1593, and to encourage English sailors to use practical astronomical navigation. Hues' work subsequently went into at least 12 other printings in Dutch, English, French and Latin.

Hues continued to have dealings with Raleigh in the 1590s, and later became a servant of Thomas Grey, 15th Baron Grey de Wilton. While Grey was imprisoned in the Tower of London for participating in the Bye Plot, Hues stayed with him. Following Grey's death in 1614, Hues attended upon Henry Percy, the 9th Earl of Northumberland, when he was confined in the Tower; one source states that Hues, Thomas Harriot and Walter Warner were Northumberland's constant companions and known as his "Three Magi", although this is disputed. Hues tutored Northumberland's son Algernon Percy (who was to become the 10th Earl of Northumberland) at Oxford, and subsequently (in 1622–1623) Algernon's younger brother Henry. In later years, Hues lived in Oxford where he was a fellow of the University, and discussed mathematics and related subjects with like-minded friends. He died on 24 May 1632 in the city and was buried in Christ Church Cathedral.

Early years and education

Robert Hues was born in 1553 at Little Hereford in Herefordshire, England. In 1571, at the age of 18 years, he entered Brasenose College, University of Oxford. English antiquarian Anthony à Wood (1632–1695) wrote that when Hues arrived at Oxford he was "only a poor scholar or servitor ... he continued for some time a very sober and serious servant ... but being sensible of the loss of time which he sustained there by constant attendance, he transferred himself to St Mary's Hall". Hues graduated with a Bachelor of Arts (B.A.) degree on 12 July 1578, having shown marked skill in Greek. He later gave advice to the dramatist and poet George Chapman for his 1616 English translation of Homer, and Chapman referred to him as his "learned and valuable friend". According to the Oxford Dictionary of National Biography, there is unsubstantiated evidence that after completing his degree Hues was held in the Tower of London, though no reason is given for this, then went abroad after his release. It is possible he travelled to Continental Europe.

Hues was a friend of the geographer Richard Hakluyt, who was then regent master of Christ Church. In the 1580s, Hakluyt introduced him to Walter Raleigh and explorers and navigators whom Raleigh knew. In addition, it is likely that Hues came to know astronomer and mathematician Thomas Harriot and Walter Warner at Thomas Allen's lectures in mathematics. The four men were later associated with Henry Percy, the 9th Earl of Northumberland, who was known as the "Wizard Earl" for his interest in scientific and alchemical experiments and his library.

Career

Hues became interested in geography and mathematics – an undated source indicates that he disputed accepted values of variations of the compass after making observations off the Newfoundland coast. He either went there on a fishing trip, or may have joined a 1585 voyage to Virginia arranged by Raleigh and led by Richard Grenville, which passed Newfoundland on the return journey to England. Hues perhaps become acquainted with the sailor Thomas Cavendish at this time, as both of them were taught by Harriot at Raleigh's school of navigation. An anonymous 17th-century manuscript states that Hues circumnavigated the world with Cavendish between 1586 and 1588 "purposely for taking the true Latitude of places"; he may have been the "NH" who wrote a brief account of the voyage that was published by Hakluyt in his 1589 work The Principall Navigations, Voiages, and Discoveries of the English Nation. In the year that book appeared, Hues was with Edward Wright on the Earl of Cumberland's raiding expedition to the Azores to capture Spanish galleons.

Beginning in August 1591, Hues joined Cavendish on another attempt to circumnavigate the globe. Sailing on the Leicester, they were accompanied by the explorer John Davis on the Desire. Cavendish and Davis agreed that they would part company once they had cleared the Strait of Magellan between Chile and Isla Grande de Tierra del Fuego, as Davis intended to sail to America to search for the Northwest Passage. The expedition was ultimately unsuccessful, although Davis did discover the Falkland Islands. In the meantime, delayed in small harbours in the Strait with crew members dying from the cold, illness and starvation, Cavendish turned back eastwards to return to England. He was plagued by mutinous crewmen, and also by natives and Portuguese who attacked his sailors seeking food and water on shore. Increasingly depressed, Cavendish died in 1592 somewhere in the Atlantic Ocean, possibly a suicide.

During the voyage, Hues made astronomical observations of the Southern Cross and other stars of the Southern Hemisphere while in the South Atlantic, and also observed the variation of the compass there and at the Equator. He returned to England after Cavendish died, and published his discoveries in the work Tractatus de globis et eorum usu (Treatise on Globes and Their Use, 1594), which he dedicated to Raleigh. The book was written to explain the use of the terrestrial and celestial globes that had been made and published by Emery Molyneux in late 1592 or early 1593. Apparently, the book was also intended to encourage English sailors to use practical astronomical navigation, although Lesley Cormack has observed that the fact it was written in Latin suggests that it was aimed at scholarly readers on the Continent. In 1595, William Sanderson, a London merchant who had largely financed the globes' construction, presented a small globe together with Hues' "Latin booke that teacheth the use of my great globes" to Robert Cecil, a statesman who was spymaster and minister to Elizabeth I and James I. Hues' work subsequently went into at least 12 other printings in Dutch (1597, 1613 and 1622), English (1638 and 1659), French (1618) and Latin (1611, 1613, 1617, 1627, 1659 and 1663). In his book An Accidence or The Path-way to Experience: Necessary for all Young Sea-men (1626), John Smith, who founded the first permanent English settlement in North America at Jamestown, Virginia, listed Hues' book among the works that a young seaman should study.

Tractatus de globis begins with a letter by Hues dedicated to Raleigh that recalled geographical discoveries made by Englishmen during Elizabeth I's reign. However, he felt that his countrymen would have surpassed the Spaniards and Portuguese if they had a complete knowledge of astronomy and geometry, which were essential to successful navigation. In the preface of the book, Hues rehearsed arguments that proved the earth is a sphere, and refuted opposing theories. The treatise was divided into five parts. The first part described elements common to Molyneux's terrestrial and celestial globes, including the circles and lines inscribed on them, zones and climates, and the use of each globe's wooden horizon circle and brass meridian. The second part described planets, fixed stars and constellations; while the third part described the lands and seas shown on the terrestrial globe, and discussed the length of the circumference of the earth and of a degree of a great circle. Part 4, which Hues considered the most important part of the work, explained how the globes enabled seamen to determine the sun's position, latitude, course and distance, amplitudes and azimuths, and time and declination. The final part of the work contained a treatise inspired by Harriot on rhumb lines. In the work, Hues also published for the first time the six fundamental navigational propositions involved in solving what was later termed the "nautical triangle" used for plane sailing. Difference of latitude and departure (or longitude) are two sides of the triangle forming a right angle, the distance travelled is the hypotenuse, and the angle between difference of latitude and distance is the course. If any two elements are known, the other two can be determined by plotting or calculation using tables of sines, tangents and secants.

In the 1590s, Hues continued to have dealings with Raleigh – he was one of the executors of Raleigh's will – and he may have been the "Hewes" who dined with Northumberland regularly in 1591. He later became a servant of Thomas Grey, the 15th and last Baron Grey de Wilton (1575–1614). For participating in the Bye Plot, a conspiracy by Roman Catholic priest William Watson to kidnap James I and force him to repeal anti-Catholic legislation, Grey was attainted and forfeited his title in 1603. The following year, he was imprisoned in the Tower of London. Grey was given consent for Hues to stay in the Tower with him. Between 1605 and 1621, Northumberland was also confined in the Tower; he was suspected of involvement in the Gunpowder Plot of 1605 because his relative Thomas Percy was among the conspirators.

In 1616, following Grey's death, Hues began to be "attendant upon th'aforesaid Earle of Northumberland for matters of learning", and was paid a yearly sum of £40 to support his research until Northumberland's death in 1632. Wood stated that Harriot, Hues and Warner were Northumberland's "constant companions, and were usually called the Earl of Northumberland's Three Magi. They had a table at the Earl's charge, and the Earl himself did constantly converse with them, and with Sir Walter Raleigh, then in the Tower". Together with the scientist Nathanael Toporley and the mathematician Thomas Allen, the men kept abreast of developments in astronomy, mathematics, physiology and the physical sciences, and made important contributions in these areas. According to the letter writer John Chamberlain, Northumberland refused a pardon offered to him in 1617, preferring to remain with Harriot, Hues and Warner. However, the fact that these companions of Northumberland were his "Three Magi" studying with him in the Tower of London has been regarded as a romanticisation by the antiquarian John Aubrey and disputed for lack of evidence. Hues was tutor to Northumberland's sons: first Algernon Percy, who subsequently became the 10th Earl of Northumberland, at Oxford where he matriculated at Christ Church in 1617; and later Algernon's younger brother Henry in 1622–1623. Hues lived at Christ Church at this time, but may have occasionally attended upon Northumberland at Petworth House in Petworth, West Sussex, and at Syon House in London after the latter's release from the Tower in 1622. Hues sometimes met Walter Warner in London, and they are known to have discussed the reflection of bodies.

Later life

In later years, Hues lived in Oxford where he discussed mathematics and allied subjects with like-minded friends. Cormack states he was a fellow at the University. Under the terms of the will of Thomas Harriot, who died on 2 July 1621, Hues and Warner were given the responsibility of helping Harriot's executor Nathaniel Torporley to prepare Harriot's mathematical papers for publication. Hues was also required to help price Harriot's books and other possessions for sale to the Bodleian Library.

Hues, who did not marry, died on 24 May 1632 in Stone House, St. Aldate's (opposite the Blue Boar in central Oxford). This was the house of John Smith, M.A., the son of a cook at Christ Church named J. Smith. In his will, Hues made many small bequests to his friends, including a sum of £20 to his "kinswoman" Mary Holly (of whom nothing is known), and 20 nobles to each of her three sisters. He was buried in Christ Church Cathedral, and a monumental brass to him was placed in Christ Church with the following inscription:

Works
  (in Latin), octavo. The following reprints are referred to by Clements Markham in his introduction to the Hakluyt Society's 1889 reprint of the English version of Tractatus de globis at pp. xxxviii–xl:
 2nd printing:  (in Dutch), quarto.
 3rd printing:  (in Latin), octavo. A reprint of the first edition of 1594.
 4th printing:  (in Dutch), quarto.
 5th printing:  (in Latin). Contains the Index Geographicus. DeGolyer Collection in the History of Science and Technology (now History of Science Collections), University of Oklahoma.
 6th printing:  (in Latin), quarto.
 7th printing:  (in French), octavo.
 8th printing:  (in Dutch), quarto.
 9th printing:  (in Latin), duodecimo.
 10th printing: .
 11th printing: A Latin version by Jodocus Hondius and John Isaac Pontanus appeared in London in 1659. Octavo.
 12th printing: , octavo. Collection of Yale University Library.
 13th printing:  (in Latin).

The Hakluyt Society's reprint of the English version was itself published as:
.

The following works also are, or appear to be, versions of Tractatus de globis et eorum usu, though they are not mentioned by Markham:
 .
  (in Latin).
 .
 .
 . Collection of the Biblioteca Nacional de Portugal.
 , two pts. Collection of the Bodleian Library.

Notes

References

 , chs. 2–4.
 .
 .

Further reading

Articles
.

Books
.

1553 births
1632 deaths
16th-century English mathematicians
17th-century English mathematicians
Academics of the University of Oxford
Alumni of Brasenose College, Oxford
Alumni of St Mary Hall, Oxford
Burials at Christ Church Cathedral, Oxford
English geographers
People from Herefordshire